With Kit Carson Over the Great Divide is a lost 1925 silent historical film directed by Frank S. Mattison and starred Roy Stewart. It was produced by Anthony Xydias.

Synopsis
Roy Stewart in an early cinema biography on a historical person. In this case frontiersman Kit Carson soon to be followed by bios on Buffalo Bill and George Armstrong Custer.

Cast
Roy Stewart - Seaton Maurey
Henry B. Walthall - Dr. Samuel Webb
Marguerite Snow - Norma Webb, wife of Samuel
Sheldon Lewis - Flint Bastille
Earl Metcalfe - Basil Morgan
Charlotte Stevens - Nancy Webb
Jack Mower - Kit Carson
Arthur Hotaling - Lt. John C. Fremont
Lew Meehan - Josef La Rocque
Billy Franey - Oswald Bliffing
Nelson McDowell - Windy Bill' Sharp

References

External links

lobby card(archived)

1925 films
Lost American films
American silent feature films
American black-and-white films
American historical films
1920s historical films
1925 lost films
Films directed by Frank S. Mattison
1920s American films
1920s English-language films